Sandhurst Road (station code: SNRD) is a railway station serving Dongri area of South Mumbai, India, on the Central and Harbour Lines of the Mumbai Suburban Railway. It is the third stop from Chhatrapati Shivaji Maharaj Terminus.

Named after Lord Sandhurst, the Governor of Bombay between 1895 and 1900, the station was built in 1910 using funds from the Bombay City Improvement Trust, which he helped raise. The Sandhurst Road railway station (upper level servicing the Harbour Line) was built in 1921. The supporting pillars of the edifice bear the inscription "GIPR 1921 Lutha Iron Works, Glasgow". The fabricated metal was imported from the United Kingdom.

In January 2017, Lokmat reported that Central Railways planned to demolish the station in order to construct the fifth and sixth railways lines between CST and Kurla. CR plans to construct a new Sandhurst Road station on P D'Mello Road.

References

Railway stations opened in 1921
Railway stations in Mumbai City district
Mumbai Suburban Railway stations
Mumbai CR railway division